Charles Bailey Clarke (October 3, 1875 – January 27, 1944) was a Portland, Maine politician. Clarke married Ellen A. Cate in 1901. Clarke was born in Bangor, Maine. From 1918 to 1921, Clarke was the Mayor of Portland, Maine. Clarke sought Maine's 1st congressional district in 1921 but lost in the Republican primary to Carroll L. Beedy by 19 votes. He died at the Maine General Hospital, aged 68, in 1944.

References

}

1875 births
Mayors of Portland, Maine
Politicians from Bangor, Maine
Maine Republicans
1944 deaths